Renate von Natzmer (1898 in Borkow (Kreis Schlawe, Pomerania) – February 18, 1935 in Berlin) was a German noblewoman who worked for the army during the Weimar Republic and Third Reich. She also worked for Polish intelligence. In the early 1930s, she met Polish agent major Jerzy Sosnowski and she became, like her friend Benita von Falkenhayn, his lover. They were arrested for spying and treason. Von Falkenhayn and von Natzmer were found guilty and sentenced to death.

Two days later, after appeals for clemency had been turned down, they became two of the last people in Germany to be beheaded with an axe. Their execution was carried out by Carl Gröpler at Plötzensee Prison in Berlin. In 1938, Adolf Hitler decreed that future executions should be by hanging or the guillotine.

References

External links
Trilingual account of the executions (English, German, Polish)

1898 births
1935 deaths
Polish spies
People condemned by Nazi courts
German untitled nobility
Executed spies
Executed German people
Executions at Plötzensee Prison
Executed German women
People executed for treason against Germany
People executed by Germany by decapitation
People from Sławno County
People from the Province of Pomerania